{{Infobox royalty
| image        = Tukoji Rao Holkar.png
| succession   =  4th Holkar Maharaja of Indore
| name         = Tukoji Rao Holkar
| caption      = Tukoji Rao Holkar
| title        = Subahdar  (Ruler of Indore) | religion     = Hinduism
| full name    = 
| coronation   = 
| birth_date   = 26 June 1723
| birth_place  = 
| death_date   = 
| death_place  = 
| reign        = 1795 - 1797
| predecessor  = Ahilyabai Holkar
| successor    = Kashi Rao Holkar
| spouse       = Rakhmabai Holkar, Radhabai Holkar
| father       = Tanuji HolkarMalhar Rao Holkar (adoptive)
| mother       = 
| issue        = Kashi Rao HolkarVithoji Rao HolkarYashwant Rao HolkarMalhar Rao II Holkar
}}
Tukoji Rao Holkar (26 June 1723 – 15 August 1797), belonging to the Holkar clan of the Marathas was the feudatory of Indore (r. 1795–1797). Tukoji Holkar was the adopted son of Malhar Rao Holkar, he was the second son of Shrimant Tanuji Holkar, a nephew of Malhar Rao Holkar. Thus he was also the grand-nephew of Malhar Rao Holkar. He married two wives. He had four sons Kashi Rao, Malhar Rao II Holkar, Yashwant Rao, Vithoji Rao.

Life and Career
After the demise of Ahilyabai Holkar, Tukoji Rao was the only suitable person who could preserve the splendour of Holkar kingdom intact. He became the fourth ruler of the kingdom for a short period from 1795 to 1797 and protected the province as a courageous soldier. It was a time of crisis when Tukoji Rao received the responsibility of the Holkar Kingdom. Khanderao, husband of Ahilyabai had already lost his life in Kumbher war of 1754. Tukoji Rao Holkar was the most trustworthy commander-in-chief of Shreemant Malhar Rao Holkar. While on death bed, Malhar Rao's appreciation of Tukoji further intensified his loyalty to the royal house of Holkars. Malhar Rao said "You are the only one who can uphold my name and protect Prince Male Rao Holkar (grandson of Malhar Rao) after my death". But, Male Rao also had a very short-life span. He died on 13 March 1767 due to sickness. At this juncture, it was Tukoji Rao who has submitted himself to the service of Ahilyabai and she could withstand with the challenges she had in the service of her people of Malwa. Ahilyabai also respected him as her brother-in-law as Tukoji Rao was the adopted son of Malhar Rao Holkar I.

The remarkable and sincere services rendered by Tukoji Rao Holkar I during the reign of Malhar Rao Holkar I as a Commander in his army and during Ahilyabai Holkar as a Commander-in-Chief could congregate much recognition to his extraordinary talents in administration and as a chief of the armed forces. He, in the meantime, never forgot for a moment his original sense of obligation to the royal house of Holkars. He was more than obedient; he was dutiful, and all his actions were directed to please and conciliate the royal chair to which he was solely indebted for his high station. The people of Malwa felt themselves secure in the hands of Tukoji Rao Holkar I and the territories comprising the Holkar State continued to be prosperous for nearly two years after the death of Ahilya Bai.

He actively participated in the conquests of Punjab and fought in the Battles of Lahore, Attock, and Peshawar in which he commanded many of the Maratha forces in the Punjab region and the frontier regions of Attock and Peshawar. He also conquered Jallalabad for a brief period where he defeated Jahan Khan. Later after the debacle in Third Battle of Panipat, he played an important role Maratha Resurrection and subsequent First Anglo-Maratha War. Post that his relation with Mahadaji Scindia deteriorated.

Tukoji Rao died on 15 August 1797. He left behind him "the character of a good soldier, a plain, unaffected man and one whose courage was superior to his craft. The records show that during his lifetime he never used a seal of his own, and always been remained loyal to Malhar Rao and his family until his last breath."

In popular culture
 In the 1994 Hindi TV series The Great Maratha'', Tukoji's character was portrayed by Sanjay Mahendirata.
 In 2021-22 Hindi TV series Punyashlok Ahilyabai, the character is portrayed by Siddharth Bannerjee initially and then Sandeep Vasantrao Gaikwad.

See also

Javji Bamble

References

1723 births
1795 deaths
Maharajas of Indore